Adventures of a Taxi Driver is a 1976 British sex comedy film directed by Stanley Long and starring Barry Evans, Judy Geeson and Adrienne Posta. There were two sequels, Adventures of a Private Eye and Adventures of a Plumber's Mate.

Cast
 Barry Evans as Joe North
 Judy Geeson as Nikki
 Adrienne Posta as Carol
 Diana Dors as Mrs. North
 Liz Fraser as Maisie
 Ian Lavender as Ronald
 Robert Lindsay as Tom
 Jane Hayden as Linda
 Stephen Lewis as Doorman
 Henry McGee as Inspector Rogers
 Angela Scoular as Marion
 Brian Wilde as Harold
 Anna Bergman as Helga
 Prudence Drage as Mrs De Vere Barker

Production
It was one of a number of British sex comedies featuring Diana Dors. The theme song (Cruisin' Casanova) was performed by Adrienne Posta.

Reception
It was the 19th most successful film at the British box office in 1976.

References

Keeping the British End Up: Four Decades of Saucy Cinema by Simon Sheridan (Titan Books) (4th edition), 2011

External links 
 

1976 films
British sex comedy films
1970s sex comedy films
Films about taxis
1976 comedy films
1970s English-language films
Films directed by Stanley Long
1970s British films